James Hammond Tillman (June 27, 1869 – April 1, 1911) was an American lawyer and politician from South Carolina. Born in Edgefield County, he received his education in the Curryton Academy; the Virginia Military Institute; the Emerson Institute of Washington, D. C. and the Georgetown University Law School. Between 1901 and 1903 he was Lieutenant Governor of South Carolina. He was the son of U.S. Representative George D. Tillman and nephew of Senator Benjamin Tillman.

In 1903 he fatally shot journalist Narciso Gener Gonzales, co-founder of Columbia newspaper The State, and was acquitted of murder in a trial that gained national coverage. It is believed that had he not murdered Gonzales, Tillman would have led the political movement which Coleman Livingston Blease inherited from him.

References

Further reading

1869 births
1911 deaths
Lieutenant Governors of South Carolina
People from Edgefield County, South Carolina
Georgetown University Law Center alumni
Virginia Military Institute alumni
19th-century American politicians
People acquitted of murder